The 1978 Grote Prijs Jef Scherens was the 14th edition of the Grote Prijs Jef Scherens cycle race and was held on 17 September 1978. The race started and finished in Leuven. The race was won by Frans Van Looy.

General classification

References

1978
1978 in road cycling
1978 in Belgian sport